Phyllonorycter aino is a moth of the family Gracillariidae. It is known from the island of Hokkaido in Japan and Korea.

The wingspan is 5.5–6 mm.

The larvae feed as leaf miners on Spiraea salicifolia. The mine is ptychonomous and located on the lower surface of the leaf.

References

aino

Moths of Japan
Moths of Korea
Moths described in 1963
Taxa named by Tosio Kumata
Leaf miners